The Women's 1500 metres event at the 2013 European Athletics U23 Championships was held in Tampere, Finland, at Ratina Stadium on 13 and 14 July.

Medalists

Results

Final
14 July 2013 

Intermediate times:
400m: 1:05.62 Elif Karabulut 
800m: 2:14.63 Corinna Harrer 
1200m: 3:19.50 Corinna Harrer

Heats
Qualified: First 4 in each heat (Q) and 4 best performers (q) advance to the Final

Summary

Details

Heat 1
13 July 2013 / 10:40

Intermediate times:
400m: 1:06.79 Kajsa Barr 
800m: 2:17.58 Corinna Harrer 
1200m: 3:23.10 Corinna Harrer

Heat 2
13 July 2013 / 10:50

Intermediate times:
400m: 1:09.42 Maureen Koster 
800m: 2:20.79 Elif Karabulut 
1200m: 3:26.84 Maureen Koster

Participation
According to an unofficial count, 23 athletes from 17 countries participated in the event.

References

1500 metres
1500 metres at the European Athletics U23 Championships